Egyhazaskozar is a village in Baranya County, Hungary, close to the Mecsek Mountains.

External links 
 Street map 

Populated places in Baranya County